Shahzada Mirza Muhammad Babur Bahadur (1796 – 13 February 1835) also known as Mirza Babur was a son of Mughal emperor Akbar II.

References

1796 births
1835 deaths
Date of birth missing
Place of birth missing
Place of death missing
Mughal princes